The 2012 NBA draft was held on June 28, 2012, at Prudential Center in Newark, New Jersey. The draft started at 7:00 pm Eastern Daylight Time (2300 UTC), and was broadcast in the United States on ESPN. In this draft, National Basketball Association (NBA) teams took turns selecting amateur U.S. college basketball players and other eligible players, including international players. This draft marked the first time that the first two players selected were from the same school (Anthony Davis and Michael Kidd-Gilchrist were teammates at Kentucky). It also set a record of having six players from one school (Kentucky) being selected in the two rounds of the draft and was the first draft to have the first three selections be college freshmen all from the same conference, the Southeastern Conference. Not only that, but it also featured the oldest player to ever get selected in an NBA draft, with Bernard James being 27 years old at the time of the draft. Of the players drafted, 30 are forwards, 21 are guards, and 9 are centers.

The 2012 NBA draft marked the first appearance of the Brooklyn Nets. This draft also marks the last draft appearance for the New Orleans Hornets. After the 2012–13 season, the franchise was renamed as the New Orleans Pelicans. New Orleans made their first draft appearance as the Pelicans in 2013.

Draft selections

Notable undrafted players

These players were not selected in the 2012 NBA Draft but have played at least one game in the NBA.

Eligibility rules

The draft was conducted under the eligibility rules established in the league's now-expired 2005 collective bargaining agreement (CBA) with its players union. The CBA that ended the 2011 lockout instituted no immediate changes to the draft, but called for a committee of owners and players to discuss future changes. As of 2011, the basic eligibility rules for the draft are listed below.
 All drafted players must be at least 19 years old during the calendar year of the draft. In terms of dates, players eligible for the 2012 draft must be born on or before December 31, 1993.
 Any player who is not an "international player", as defined in the CBA, must be at least one year removed from the graduation of his high school class. The CBA defines "international players" as players who permanently resided outside the U.S. for three years prior to the draft, did not complete high school in the U.S., and have never enrolled at a U.S. college or university.

The basic requirement for automatic eligibility for a U.S. player is the completion of his college eligibility. Players who meet the CBA definition of "international players" are automatically eligible if their 22nd birthday falls during or before the calendar year of the draft (i.e., born on or before December 31, 1990). U.S. players who were at least one year removed from their high school graduation and have played minor-league basketball with a team outside the NBA are also automatically eligible.

A player who is not automatically eligible must declare his eligibility for the draft by notifying the NBA offices in writing no later than 60 days before the draft. For the 2012 draft, this date fell on April 29. Under NCAA rules, players will only have until April 10 to withdraw from the draft and maintain their college eligibility.

A player who has hired an agent will forfeit his remaining college eligibility, regardless of whether he is drafted. Also, while the CBA allows a player to withdraw from the draft twice, the NCAA mandates that a player who has declared twice loses his college eligibility.

Entrants

Early entrants
On May 3, 2012, the league announced a list of 67 early entry candidates which consists of 50 collegiate players and 17 international players. At the withdrawal deadline, 11 early entry candidates withdrew from the draft, leaving 49 collegiate players and 7 international players as the early entry candidates for the draft.

College underclassmen
(All players are Americans except as indicated.)

Erik Austin – F, Jackson College (sophomore)
Harrison Barnes – SF, North Carolina (sophomore)
Will Barton – G, Memphis (sophomore)
Bradley Beal – G, Florida (freshman)
J'Covan Brown – G, Texas (junior)
Dominic Cheek – G, Villanova (junior)
Jared Cunningham – G, Oregon State (junior)
Anthony Davis – F/C, Kentucky (freshman)
Andre Drummond – C, Connecticut (freshman)
Dominique Ferguson – F, Florida International (sophomore)
Justin Hamilton – C, LSU (junior)
Maurice Harkless – F, St. John's (freshman)
John Henson – F, North Carolina (junior)
John Jenkins – SG, Vanderbilt (junior)
Perry Jones III – F, Baylor (sophomore)
Terrence Jones – F, Kentucky (sophomore)
Xavier Jones - G, Missouri State-West Plains (sophomore)
Michael Kidd-Gilchrist – G, Kentucky (freshman)
Doron Lamb – G, Kentucky (sophomore)
Jeremy Lamb – G/F, Connecticut (sophomore)
Meyers Leonard – C, Illinois (sophomore)
Damian Lillard – G, Weber State (junior)
Kendall Marshall – PG, North Carolina (sophomore)
 Fab Melo – C, Syracuse (sophomore)
Khris Middleton – F, Texas A&M (junior)
Quincy Miller – F, Baylor (freshman)

Tony Mitchell – SF, Alabama (junior)
Arnett Moultrie – F/C, Mississippi State (junior)
Reeves Nelson – F, UCLA (junior)
Nelson left the Bruins in December 2011 and had been playing professionally for Žalgiris Kaunas (Lithuania) before declaring for the draft.
Austin Rivers – G, Duke (freshman)
Peter Roberson – C, Alabama (junior)
Quincy Roberts – G, Grambling State (junior)
Thomas Robinson – PF, Kansas (junior)
Terrence Ross – G, Washington (sophomore)
Avery Scharer – G, Shoreline CC (WA) (sophomore)
Renardo Sidney – F, Mississippi State (junior)
Jonathon Simmons – G, Houston (junior)
Terrell Stoglin – G, Maryland (sophomore)
 Gerardo Suero – G, Albany (junior)
Jared Sullinger – PF, Ohio State (sophomore)
Marquis Teague – G, Kentucky (freshman)
Joston Thomas – F, Hawaii (junior)
Hollis Thompson – F, Georgetown (junior)
Rich Townsend-Gant – F, Vancouver Island U (junior)
Dion Waiters – G, Syracuse (sophomore)
Maalik Wayns – PG, Villanova (junior)
Royce White – F, Iowa State (sophomore)
D'Angelo Williams – G, Notre Dame (CA) (junior)
Tony Wroten – G, Washington (freshman)

International players

Automatically eligible entrants
Players who do not meet the criteria for "international" players are automatically eligible if they meet any of the following criteria:
 They have completed 4 years of their college eligibility.
 If they graduated from high school in the U.S., but did not enroll in a U.S. college or university, four years have passed since their high school class graduated.
 They have signed a contract with a professional basketball team outside of the NBA, anywhere in the world, and have played under that contract.

Players who meet the criteria for "international" players are automatically eligible if they meet any of the following criteria:
 They are least 22 years old during the calendar year of the draft. In terms of dates, players born on or before December 31, 1990, are automatically eligible for the 2012 draft.
 They have signed a contract with a professional basketball team outside of the NBA within the United States, and have played under that contract.

Draft lottery

The first 14 picks in the draft belong to teams that miss the playoffs; the order was determined through a lottery. The lottery determined the three teams that will obtain the first three picks on the draft. The remaining first-round picks and the second-round picks were assigned to teams in reverse order of their win–loss record in the previous season.

The lottery was held on May 30, 2012, in the Disney/ABC Times Square Studio in New York City. The New Orleans Hornets won the rights to the first overall selection with a 13.7% chance to win. The Hornets were a league-owned team at the time, leading to continued conspiracy theories about the lottery process. The Charlotte Bobcats, who had the worst record and the biggest chance to win the lottery, won the second overall pick.

Below were the chances for each team to get specific picks in the 2012 draft lottery, rounded to three decimal places.

Invited attendees
The NBA annually invites 10 to 15 players to sit in the so-called "green room", a special room set aside at the draft site for the invited players plus their families and agents. This season, the following 14 players were invited (listed alphabetically). All players represented the United States of America.

Harrison Barnes, North Carolina
Bradley Beal, Florida
Anthony Davis, Kentucky
Andre Drummond, Connecticut
John Henson, North Carolina
Michael Kidd-Gilchrist, Kentucky
Jeremy Lamb, Connecticut

Meyers Leonard, Illinois
Damian Lillard, Weber State
Austin Rivers, Duke
Thomas Robinson, Kansas
Terrence Ross, Washington
Dion Waiters, Syracuse
Tyler Zeller, North Carolina

Trades involving draft picks

Pre-draft trades
Prior to the day of the draft, the following trades were made and resulted in exchanges of draft picks between the teams.

Draft-day trades
The following trades involving drafted players were made on the day of the draft

See also

 List of first overall NBA draft picks

References

External links
2012 NBA Draft Official Site
2012 NBA Draft at ESPN

Draft
National Basketball Association draft
NBA draft
NBA draft
21st century in Newark, New Jersey
Basketball in Newark, New Jersey
Events in Newark, New Jersey